Pentila pseudorotha, the large-spotted red pentila, is a butterfly in the family Lycaenidae. It is found in Nigeria and Cameroon.

Adults feed on nectar from tendrils.

References

Butterflies described in 1961
Poritiinae